Pentila preussi, the ochreous red pentila, is a butterfly in the family Lycaenidae. It is found in Senegal, Guinea, Sierra Leone and Ivory Coast. Their habitat consists primarily of drier forests.

Subspecies
Pentila preussi preussi (Guinea, Sierra Leone, western Ivory Coast)
Pentila preussi fayei Stempffer, 1963 (Senegal, coast of Guinea)

References

Butterflies described in 1888
Poritiinae
Butterflies of Africa
Taxa named by Otto Staudinger